Woman's Viewpoint may refer to:

Woman's Viewpoint (magazine), woman's journal published between 1923-1927
Women's Viewpoint (TV show), a British TV show